Pier Pressure is the third and final album by the progressive bluegrass band Chesapeake.
It is marked by more original material by the group members - four songs by bassist Coleman as well as one by guitarist Klein.

Track listing

 "Once a Day" (T. Michael Coleman) 2:52
 "Full Force Gale" (Morrison) 3:51
 "Bed of Roses" (Benson, Gillette) 4:14
 "Nothing Ain't a Lot" (T. Michael Coleman) 3:09
 "Carolina Star" (Motfatt) 3:35
 "Sleepwalk(ing) at the Drive-In" (Farina) 4:03
 "Baby Blue Eyes" (Eanes) 3:39
 "White PIlgrim" (Traditional) 2:54
 "Guilty" (T. Michael Coleman) 2:57
 "Rockin' Hillbilly" (T. Michael Coleman) 3:07
 "Don't Lay Down" (Moondi Klein) 3:25
 "Working on a Building" (Traditional) 5:18

Personnel
 Moondi Klein - lead vocals, guitar, piano
 Mike Auldridge - Dobro, lap steel, pedal steel, guitar, vocals
 Jimmy Gaudreau - mandolin, guitar, vocals
 T. Michael Coleman - bass guitar, guitar, vocals

with
 Pat McInerney - percussion, drums
 Linda Ronstadt - vocals on "Bed of Roses"

References

1997 albums
Sugar Hill Records albums